Saint-Renan is a commune in the Finistère department of Brittany in north-western France.

History 
The city is named after the Irish Saint Rónán who came in the 5th or 6th century to evangelize the area.

While Brest was still a village, the city of Saint-Renan developed throughout the Middle Ages. In 1276, the Duke of Brittany established one of the courts of justice there. Until the end of the 17th century, Saint-Renan was a "Sénéchaussée" (town of the seneschal), first ducal and then royal. Many of the buildings in the town center are from this period.

Population
Inhabitants of Saint-Renan are called Renanais in French.

Tourism 
Old houses of 15th and 16th centuries are historical and architectural attractions.

Held every two years, the medieval festival of Saint-Renan, the biggest of the department, highlights the city's heritage.

The Saturday morning market – one of the biggest – is the opportunity to taste local products such as "kouign amann" (cake which name means "sugar and butter" in Breton language), Kig Ha Farz, mushrooms, crepes, cider, caramel, and chitterling sausages etc.

Six artificial lakes are part of the industrial heritage of the city, which was nicknamed "the European capital of tin" in the 1960s. The two largest, "Ty Colo" and "Comiren", are walking destinations.

The 17th-century church has undergone several transformations over time. Built on top of a hill, its bell tower is visible from a large part of the city. The churchyard contains a military area dedicated to British aviators from the Royal Air Force who died during the World War II.

Breton language
In 2016, 14% of primary-school children attended bilingual schools, where Breton is taught alongside French.

Notable natives and residents 
 Nolwenn Leroy, singer and songwriter, who rose to fame after winning the second series of the French television reality show Star Academy.
 Benoît Hamon, politician, member of both the Socialist Party (“PS”), and the Party of European Socialists, candidate for the 2017 French Presidential Election.

See also
Communes of the Finistère department

References

External links

Official website 

Mayors of Finistère Association 

Communes of Finistère